The Baxter Althane disaster in autumn 2001 was a series of 53 sudden deaths of kidney failure patients in Spain, Croatia, Italy, Germany, Taiwan, Colombia and the USA (mainly Nebraska and Texas). All had received hospital treatment with Althane hemodialysis equipment, a product range manufactured by Baxter International, USA.

Although official investigations initially found no link between the cases, Baxter Co. eventually published its own findings, admitting that a perfluorohydrocarbon-based cleaning fluid was not properly removed from the tubings during manufacture. Baxter also announced discontinuation and permanent recall of all Althane equipment. Families of most non-US victims were compensated by Baxter voluntarily, while US plaintiffs settled via a class action lawsuit. The company continues to manufacture dialysis machines of a newer design.

References

External links
 Baxter News Release "Baxter Corporation responds to Croatian Investigators", 7 Jan 2002
 Baxter News Release "Baxter announces agreement with families... in Spain", 28 Nov 2001
 Action Suit alert at findlas.com

2001 health disasters
2001 industrial disasters
2001 disasters in the United States
2001 disasters in Europe
Baxter International
Medical scandals
Drug safety